The Data Governance Act (DGA) is a legislative proposal of the European Commission that aims to create a framework which will facilitate data-sharing. The proposal was first announced within the 2020 European strategy for data and was officially presented by Margrethe Vestager in 25 November 2020. The DGA covers the data of public bodies, private companies, and citizens. Its main aims are to safely enable the sharing of sensitive data held by public bodies, to regulate data sharing by private actors.  On 30November 2021, the EU Parliament and Council reached an agreement on the wording of the DGA.  Formal approval by those bodies is still required but that should be procedural.

The proposed legislation has been analyzed by independent parties.

See also 

 Data Act (European Union)
 General Data Protection Regulation

References

External links 

 Text of the Regulation
 Text of Commission's Proposal for a REGULATION OF THE EUROPEAN PARLIAMENT AND OF THE COUNCIL on European data governance (Data Governance Act)
 Procedure 2020/0340/COD on EUR-Lex
 Procedure 2020/0340(COD) on ŒIL

2020 in law
2020 in the European Union
European Digital Strategy
Policies of the European Union
Data laws of Europe
Draft European Union laws
European Union regulations